The Cherkess Autonomous Oblast (Čérkés avtonomne oblast’) or Cherkessia (Šerdžes, or , Čérkés xekw) was an autonomous oblast of the Russian SFSR, Soviet Union, created on April 26, 1926 by the split of the Karachay-Cherkess Autonomous Oblast.  It was called the Cherkess National Okrug until April 30, 1928. It was dissolved in 1957 by the creation of the new Karachay-Cherkess Autonomous Oblast.

Territorial changes of the Cherkess Autonomous Oblast

References

1926 establishments in the Soviet Union
1957 disestablishments in the Soviet Union
Autonomous oblasts of the Soviet Union
History of Karachay-Cherkessia
States and territories established in 1926
States and territories disestablished in 1957